Saah Nimley (born June 3, 1993) is a Liberian professional basketball player. He played college basketball for Charleston Southern. As a senior in 2014–15, Nimley averaged 21.5 points and 4.1 assists per game, ranking first and third in the Big South, respectively. The guard was named the Big South Player of the Year that year. 

Nimley retired in 2019 and started his coaching career, becoming an assistant coach for the Charleston Southern Buccaneers.

References

External links
Charleston Southern Buccaneers bio
Eurobasket.com profile

1993 births
Living people
Basketball coaches from Georgia (U.S. state)
Basketball players from Georgia (U.S. state)
BC Nevėžis players
BC Šiauliai players
Charleston Southern Buccaneers men's basketball coaches
Charleston Southern Buccaneers men's basketball players
Guards (basketball)
Liberian men's basketball players
Newcastle Eagles players
People from Lawrenceville, Georgia
Sportspeople from Monrovia
Sportspeople from the Atlanta metropolitan area